Mark Allen Livolsi (April 10, 1962 – September 23, 2018) was an American film editor. Known primarily for his work on the hit comedies Wedding Crashers (2005) and The Devil Wears Prada (2006), both of which were nominated for an ACE Eddie Award.

Livolsi's first film editing credit was for Cameron Crowe's Vanilla Sky (2001), with Joe Hutshing. Livolsi had worked as an associate editor with Hutshing and Saar Klein on Crowe's previous film, Almost Famous (2000), whose editing was recognized by an Academy Award nomination. By the time he worked on Almost Famous, Livolsi had extensive experience as an assistant film editor, including four of Woody Allen's films that were edited by Susan E. Morse; Livolsi acknowledges Morse, David Brenner, Alan Heim, and Hutshing as his educators and mentors.

Livolsi was from Canonsburg, Pennsylvania. He was married to his wife Maria and together they had two children: Mark and Maddie. Livolsi had been elected to membership in the American Cinema Editors.

Livolsi died in Pasadena, California, aged 56. His final film as editor, The Lion King (2019), is dedicated to him.

Selected filmography
The year of release and director of each film are indicated in parenthesis.
Vanilla Sky (with Joe Hutshing) (2001 – Crowe)
Pieces of April (2003 – Hedges)
The Girl Next Door (2004 – Greenfield)
My Suicidal Sweetheart (2005 – Parness)
Wedding Crashers (2005 – Dobkin)

The Devil Wears Prada (2006 – Frankel)
Fred Claus (2007 – Dobkin)
Marley & Me (2008 – Frankel)
The Blind Side (2009 – Hancock)
The Big Year (2011 – Frankel)
We Bought a Zoo (2011 – Crowe)
Saving Mr. Banks (2013 – Hancock)
The Judge (2014 – Dobkin)
The Jungle Book (2016 – Favreau)
Wonder (2017 – Chbosky)
The Lion King (with Adam Gerstel) (2019 – Favreau)

References

External links

1962 births
2018 deaths
American film editors
American Cinema Editors
People from Mt. Lebanon, Pennsylvania